Windfall is a 2022 American crime thriller film directed by Charlie McDowell from a screenplay by Andrew Kevin Walker and Justin Lader. The film stars Jason Segel, Lily Collins, and Jesse Plemons.

Windfall was released on March 18, 2022, by Netflix.

Plot 
A wealthy CEO and his wife come to their vacation home only to discover a burglar. The CEO agrees to give the burglar money and forget about the ordeal without calling the police, but the burglar locks them in a sauna. Returning to his car, the burglar spots a camera recording him. He returns to the house and confronts the couple. The burglar also asks for $500,000 in cash. The CEO calls his assistant, who tells him that the money will arrive the following day.

Several conversations between the trio make it clear that the CEO and his wife are in a strained relationship, although the CEO looks forward to having children. At night, the wife tells the burglar that she is not happy with her life; the burglar tells her to stop calling herself a victim for marrying a man for his wealth. The next day, the CEO accuses the burglar of being an employee made redundant by the algorithm he has invented, which aids companies undergoing downsizing. A gardener arrives to work on the house. The gardener takes the trio outside and talks to the CEO about planting an oak tree. The CEO writes the gardener a note using his sketch of the garden. The burglar takes notice and orders the gardener to enter the house. His wife and the burglar criticize the CEO for jeopardizing another person's life.

After a few hours, the CEO finally breaks. He belittles the burglar and claims he will not do anything to them because his life is meaningless. After the burglar shoots a warning shot, the gardener tries to escape. The gardener trips and falls through a glass door, and a shard of glass pierces his neck, killing him.

The money is left in front of the house. The wife retrieves it. She sees a passing car but does not signal it before returning inside. The burglar ties up the CEO and his wife in different rooms. The burglar admits to the CEO that he wanted to know what it was like to live like a rich person. He reveals to the CEO that his wife is taking birth control pills. The wife cuts herself free and kills the burglar with a small statue. She then shoots her husband dead, plants the gun in the burglar's hand, and leaves the property.

Cast 
 Jason Segel as Nobody
 Lily Collins as Wife
 Jesse Plemons as CEO
 Omar Leyva as Gardener

Production 
Filming took place in March 2021 in Ojai, California, with production fully wrapping in July. Later that month, Netflix acquired the film for a "major eight-figures" sum.

Reception

References

External links 
 
 

2022 films
2022 crime thriller films
2020s English-language films
American crime thriller films
English-language Netflix original films
Films about couples
Films about vacationing
Films shot in Ventura County, California
Films with screenplays by Andrew Kevin Walker
Home invasions in film
2020s American films